Dzyarzhynskaya Hara (Belarusian: Дзяржынская гара - Dziaržynskaja hara ) is the highest point in Belarus. The hill is 345 meters (1,130 ft) above sea level and is located west of Minsk, near Dzyarzhynsk, in the village Skirmuntava. The original name of the hill was Svyataya hara (Святая гара, “Holy mountain”). In 1958 the hill was renamed Dzyarzhynskaya hara, in honour of Felix Dzerzhinsky, the founder of the NKVD.

See also
 Geography of Belarus
 Extreme points of Belarus
 List of highest points of European countries
 List of elevation extremes by country

References

External links
 "Hara Dzyarzhynskaya, Belarus" on Peakbagger

Landforms of Belarus
Highest points of countries
Hills of Europe